Muyembe–Nakapiripirit Road is a road in the Eastern and Northern regions of Uganda. The road  connects the towns of Muyembe in Bulambuli District, to the town of Nakapiripirit in  Nakapiripirit District.

Location
The coordinates of the road near Tabagonyi are 1°28'45.0"N, 34°24'56.0"E (Latitude:1.479179; Longitude:34.415548).

Upgrade to bitumen
In December 2014, this road was listed as "At project preparation".

In March 2015, the Ugandan Parliament, authorized the borrowing of US$110 million, representing 86 percent of the cost, from the Islamic Development Bank (IDB). The government of Uganda will fund the remaining 14 percent, amounting to about US$18 million or local currency equivalent.

In December 2015, Uganda National Roads Authority advertised for construction companies to tender bids for the construction works, comprising  of main roads and an additional  of side roads and connectors, totaling . Following the evaluation of those bids, a preferred contractor will be selected and a construction contract will be executed between the parties concerned.

The construction contract was awarded to a Turkish construction company, Polat Yol Yapi Sanayi ve Ticaret A.S. On 7 November 2019, the construction contract was signed between UNRA, represented by Allen Kagina, the agency's executive director and Emre Polat, representing the contractor. Work is expected to start in 2021 and conclude in 2023. In November 2020, the New Vision newspaper reported that construction would begin in 2021 and last three years.

In March 2022, the Nile Post, a Ugandan online publication, reported that works were ongoing, but were behind schedule. Work which began on 30 March 2020, is contractually expected to end on 30 March 2023, and then followed by one year of "defects liability period".

Financing
In November 2018, the Daily Monitor newspaper reported that the Islamic Development Bank (IsDB) had committed to lend US$114.12 million while the government of Uganda will contribute $18 million in counter-funding, of which US$5 million will go towards land compensation. Construction is expected to start in 2019 and last 3 years. In November 2019, it was reported that the Ugandan government had borrowed USh399 billion (US$109 million) from the IsDB to fund the upgrade of his road.

See also
 Economy of Uganda
 List of roads in Uganda

References

External links
 Uganda National Road Authority Homepage
 Ugandan Government Increases Road Network Funding
 Government Seeks to Widen Road Reserves to 8 Meters

Roads in Uganda
Sironko District
Nakapiripirit District
Bugisu sub-region
Karamoja
Eastern Region, Uganda
Northern Region, Uganda